Harold Mitchell (1891 – September 14, 1952) was a politician in Newfoundland. He represented Trinity South in the Newfoundland House of Assembly from 1932 to 1934 as a United Newfoundland Party member.

The son of John B. Mitchell and Anna Barnes, he was born in St. John's and later entered the family brokerage agency. In 1915, Mitchell joined the Newfoundland Regiment. He was wounded at Gallipoli and returned home to Newfoundland. He helped form the Great War Veterans' Association and served as the first president of the local branch of the association. Mitchell was an unsuccessful candidate for the Trinity Bay seat in the Newfoundland assembly in 1924 and 1928; he was elected in 1932, defeating Sir Richard Squires. He served in the Newfoundland cabinet as a minister without portfolio.

Mitchell died in New York City in 1952.

References 

1891 births
1952 deaths
United Newfoundland Party MHAs
Politicians from St. John's, Newfoundland and Labrador
Newfoundland military personnel of World War I
Royal Newfoundland Regiment soldiers
Dominion of Newfoundland people